HMS Conqueror was a British  nuclear-powered fleet submarine which served in the Royal Navy from 1971 to 1990. She was built by Cammell Laird at Birkenhead.

Conqueror  the only nuclear-powered submarine to have engaged an enemy ship with torpedoes, sinking the cruiser General Belgrano during the 1982 Falklands War.

Construction
Conqueror was ordered on 9 August 1966 and was laid down at Cammell Laird's Birkenhead shipyard on 5 December 1967; she was launched on 28 August 1969. Construction was delayed by slow working by Cammell Laird's workforce, and sabotage of the ship's gearbox, which delayed completion by several months. Conqueror was finally commissioned on 9 November 1971; she was the last nuclear submarine built by Cammell Laird.

Operational history

Falklands War
Conqueror, commanded by Commander Chris Wreford-Brown, was deployed during the Falklands War, setting sail from Faslane Naval Base on the Gareloch in Scotland on 3 April 1982, one day after the Argentine invasion. Conqueror arrived in the exclusion zone around the Falkland Islands 21 days later and was ordered to scan the area for Argentine shipping, particularly the aircraft carrier Veinticinco de Mayo ("25th of May").

On 30 April, she spotted the Argentine light cruiser General Belgrano sailing southwest of the Falklands, just outside the exclusion zone imposed by the British on all shipping. With Veinticinco de Mayo approaching the islands from the north, the commander of the British carrier battle group in the South Atlantic, Rear Admiral "Sandy" Woodward, feared a pincer attack, with General Belgrano attacking from the south and Veinticinco de Mayo from the north. Woodward requested permission from his superiors to sink General Belgrano.

After some debate, permission to engage General Belgrano was sent to the submarine from the Commander-in-Chief Fleet and Task Force commander, Admiral Sir John Fieldhouse, at the Royal Navy's command centre in Northwood in the United Kingdom. In the intervening period, General Belgrano had retired from its attack position and turned west, since Veinticinco de Mayo was not yet ready to engage the British fleet. This would cause some controversy, although General Belgranos captain and the Argentine government acknowledged that the attack was a legitimate act of war.

On 2 May Conqueror became the first nuclear-powered submarine to sink an enemy surface ship using torpedoes, launching three Mark 8 torpedoes at General Belgrano, two of which struck the ship and exploded. Twenty minutes later, the ship was sinking rapidly and was abandoned by her crew. General Belgrano was unable to issue a Mayday signal because of electrical failure; this and poor visibility meant the two escorting destroyers ARA Piedra Buena and ARA Bouchard (both also ex-United States Navy vessels) were unaware of the sinking until some hours later. A total of 323 men were killed.

Adding to the confusion, the crew of Bouchard felt an impact that was possibly the third torpedo striking at the end of its run (an examination of the ship later showed an impact mark consistent with a torpedo). The two ships continued on their course westward and began dropping depth charges. By the time the ships realised that something had happened to General Belgrano, it was already dark and the weather had worsened, scattering the life rafts.

Conquerors war did not end there. The crew of the submarine had to face Argentine Air Force attempts to locate her in the days after the attack, which had shocked the Argentine people and ruling dictatorship. Conqueror did not fire again throughout the war, but helped the task force by using sophisticated monitoring equipment to track Argentine aircraft departing from the mainland.

After the war, Conqueror returned to Faslane, flying a Jolly Roger, a customary act of Royal Navy submarines after a kill. The flag, now in the Royal Navy Submarine Museum, featured an atom for Conqueror being the only nuclear submarine with a kill, crossed torpedoes for the type of weapon used, a dagger indicating a cloak-and-dagger operation, and the outline of a cruiser for what kind of ship was sunk. When asked about the incident later, Commander Wreford-Brown responded, "The Royal Navy spent thirteen years preparing me for such an occasion. It would have been regarded as extremely dreary if I had fouled it up".

Operation Barmaid
Later in 1982, Conqueror completed a raid to acquire a Soviet passive towed sonar array from its Polish-flagged towing vessel. The operation, a joint mission between British and American forces, was conducted on the boundary of Soviet territorial waters.

Collision
The yacht sank and four crew members were rescued.

Decommissioning

Conqueror was decommissioned in 1990 and the periscopes, captain's cabin and main control panel from the submarine's control room are on display in the Royal Navy Submarine Museum in Gosport.  , Conqueror is one of 20 nuclear submarines still held in storage by the Ministry of Defence, awaiting final disposal.

Notes

References

Sources

Further reading

External links
 Hansard: Loss of the "control room log" of HMS Conqueror

Churchill-class submarines
Ships built on the River Mersey
Falklands War naval ships of the United Kingdom
1969 ships